Promysel Narimanova (also, Bank, Bankovski-Promysl, Bozhiy Promysel, Bozhly Promysel, Imeni Narimanova, and Promysel imeni Narimanova) is a village in the Neftchala Rayon of Azerbaijan.

References 

Populated places in Neftchala District